The Ford 9-inch is an automobile axle manufactured by Ford Motor Company. It is known as one of the most popular axles in automotive history. It was introduced in 1957 model year cars and ended production in 1986, having been phased out in favor of the Ford 8.8 inch axle. However, aftermarket companies still produce the 9-inch design.

One of the features which distinguishes this axle from other high-performance or heavy-duty domestic solid axles is that unlike other axle designs, access to the differential gears is not through the rear center cover; rather, in the Ford 9 inch, the rear cover is welded to the axle housing, and access to internals is obtained by removing the center cover on the pinion (front) side of the axle through which the driveshaft yoke connects, with the differential assembly coming out of the axle as a unit attached to the cover. Although this requires disconnecting the driveshaft to access the internal gearset, it offers the advantage of being able to disassemble and reassemble the differential gears and adjust clearances conveniently on the benchtop, rather than with the restricted access of working within the axle housing under the car.

General specifications 

 Ring gear measures 
 Factory nodular center sections are usually marked with an "N". 
 Factory center section's biggest flaw is the pinion bearing pilot support, which are prone to cracking due to the nature of the pinion gear/crown gear relationship. 
 Factory center sections carry two (2) different bearing dimensions.
 Factory axle shaft and differential spline count is 28 and 31, although aftermarket axles with 35 and 40 spline count are readily available from reputable manufacturers.
 Wide variety of axle bearing flanges were fabricated.
 Although most factory assemblies carried drum brakes, there were units which were fitted with disc brakes (Thunderbird, etc.).
 Factory axle (wheel) bearings are retained via a press-on collar, and not an internal c-clip inside the differential.
 Axles are straight, and not tapered (which can be cut and resplined, if so needed).

Common applications 
1957-1986 Ford F-100 & F-150
1958-1960 Edsel (All series including Wagons)
1976-1980 Ford Granada
1976-1979 Lincoln Versallies
1957-1970 Ford Fairlane
1957-1971 Ford Thunderbird
1964 1/2-1973 Ford Mustang
1966-1983 Ford Bronco
1967-1984 Ford Falcon (Australia)
1968-1976 Ford Torino
1969-1970 1/2 Ford Falcon (North America)
1957-1959 Ranchero and Wagon
1967-1973 Ranchero

See also
10.5" Corporate 14 Bolt Differential
Dana 60

Notes

References

Automotive engineering
Automobile axles